Nicolas-Joseph-Laurent Gilbert (December 15, 1750 – November 16, 1780) was a French poet born at Fontenoy-le-Château, Vosges, Lorraine.

Having completed his education at the college of Dole, he devoted himself for a time to a half-scholastic, half-literary life at Nancy, but in 1774 he found his way to the capital. As an opponent of the Encyclopaedists and a panegyrist of Louis XV, he received considerable pensions. He died in Paris in 1780 from the results of a fall from his horse.

The satiric force of one or two of his pieces, as Mon Apologie (1778) and Le Dix-huitième Siècle (1775), would alone be sufficient to preserve his reputation, which has been further increased by modern writers, who, like Alfred de Vigny in his Stello (chaps. 7-13), considered him a victim to the spite of his philosophic opponents. His best-known verses are the Ode imitée de plusieurs psaumes, usually entitled Adieux à la vie.

Among his other works may be mentioned Les Familles du Darius et d'Eridame, histoire persane (1770), Le Carnaval des auteurs (1773), Odes nouvelles et patriotiques (1775). Gilbert's Œuvres complètes were first published in 1788.

References
 
 Catholic Encyclopedia article
 Complete works scanned on Gallica

External links
 
 

1750 births
1780 deaths
People from Vosges (department)
French poets
French male poets